Johan Bontekoe (1 July 1943 – 25 March 2006) was a Dutch freestyle swimmer who won a gold medal in the 400 meter event at the 1962 European Aquatics Championships. This was the second ever European gold medal for a Dutch male swimmer after 1938 (Kees Hoving). He also competed in the 1964 Summer Olympics but failed to reach the finals. Meanwhile, he was the leading middle and long-distance freestyle swimmer in the Netherlands, winning almost all 200–1500 m events and setting 28 national records between 1960 and 1964. After retiring, he worked in a bank, but also remained associated with the Dutch swimming federation. He suffered from ill health in his last years, and died of pneumonia at the age 62.

References

1943 births
2006 deaths
Dutch male freestyle swimmers
Olympic swimmers of the Netherlands
Swimmers at the 1964 Summer Olympics
People from Assen
European Aquatics Championships medalists in swimming
Sportspeople from Drenthe